John Watlington Perry-Watlington (7 December 1823 – 24 February 1882), known as John Watlington Perry until 1848, was a British Conservative politician.

Born in London in 1823 as John Watlington Perry, he was the only son of Thomas Perry and Maria Jane, daughter of George Watlington. He was first educated at the Harrow School, before being admitted to Trinity College, Cambridge in Michaelmas of 1841. There, he became a Bachelor of Arts in 1845, and a Master of the Arts in 1849. In 1844, he was admitted to the Inner Temple Four years later he added the additional surname of Watlington, and a year after that he married Margaret Emily, daughter of Reverend Charles W. Ethelston.

Perry-Watlington was first elected Conservative MP for South Essex at the 1859 general election, but stood down at the next election in 1865.

Throughout his life, Perry-Watlington was a Major in the Essex Yeomanry, a Justice of the Peace and Deputy Lieutenant for Essex and Hertfordshire, and, in 1855, the High Sheriff of Essex.

References

External links
 

Conservative Party (UK) MPs for English constituencies
UK MPs 1859–1865
1823 births
1882 deaths
English justices of the peace
High Sheriffs of Essex
Deputy Lieutenants of Essex
Deputy Lieutenants of Hertfordshire
Essex Yeomanry officers
Alumni of Trinity College, Cambridge
People educated at Harrow School